The Magician (French: Le Magicien) is a French animated television series created by Florian Ferrier, Gilles Adrien, and Savin Yeatman-Eiffel, the last of whom also served as the series' story editor. It was produced by Gaumont Multimedia (however, it is currently owned by Xilam) in 1997. It aired on Fox in 1999, one of the few European shows to air in the US at the time.

Synopsis
A series of scientific discoveries and radical advances in technology have re-organized society during the third millennium. Taking advantage of widespread hope and optimism in Electro City, the crime syndicates (chiefly under the mobster "Black Jack" Malone) have discreetly taken control of all important positions. They are repeatedly defeated by protagonist Ace Cooper and his magic assistant Cosmo.

Characters

Main characters
 Ace Cooper (voiced by Michael Donovan) - The main protagonist of the series. He is a famous stage magician and superhero, who co-operates with the police against criminals. In an earlier life, Ace used to be the former assistant of Jack "Black Jack" Malone until an accident he was involved in caused Ace to leave Jack's services. Since then, he managed to become a magic-based superhero that fights "Black Jack" Malone.
 Zina (vocal effects provided by Kath Soucie) - Ace Cooper's pet black panther.
 Cosmo (voiced by Rob Paulsen) - Ace Cooper's magic assistant and sidekick. He was taken in by Ace after his careless father abandoned him.
 Lt. Derek Vega (voiced by Charles Napier) - A police lieutenant for the Electro City Police Department who helps Ace and Cosmos in their investigations.
 Angel (voiced by Kath Soucie) - The CPU of Ace Cooper's Magic Express.

Villains
 Jack "Black Jack" Malone (voiced by Charles Napier) - The primary antagonist of the series, the principal crime boss in Electro City, and the proprietor of the "Croesus Palace" casino. Following an accident involving Ace who used to work for him, "Black Jack" Malone is confined to a hovering chair. Despite the criminal activities he has committed, he has never been convicted of anything due to various loopholes and having high-level connections.
 Diamond (voiced by Rob Paulsen) - "Black Jack" Malone's intelligent henchman.
 Spade (voiced by Michael Donovan) - "Black Jack" Malone's strong henchman.
 Clockwise (voiced by Billy West) - "Black Jack" Malone's strategist, accountant, and lawyer who often assists "Black Jack" Malone in using methods to keep him from getting indicted.
 "Sonny Boy" Serge (voiced by Rob Paulsen) - A millionaire mobster, owner of the 'Sunset' casino, and the son of engineer Jonathan Serge. He tends to be at odds with "Black Jack" Malone and periodically, with the elder Serge as well. 
 Faceless (voiced by Kath Soucie) - A full-costumed female assassin and sneak-thief hired by "Black Jack" Malone to kill the Magician. Faceless' gloves have retractable claws. Captain Friedrich refuses to believe she even exists despite what Ace, Cosmo, and Vega keep telling him.
 Yago (voiced by Rob Paulsen) - A magician who is a rival of Ace Cooper.
 Dr. Blaun (voiced by Michael Donovan) - A mad scientist.
 Gus Morland (voiced by Billy West) - A former friend of Ace Cooper who is revived from his cryonic state as a cryonic mutant. He planned revenge on "Black Jack" Malone until Ace stopped him and restored him to normal.
 Aldus Teron (voiced by Billy West) - The head of a company that wanted to place his mind in a specially-bred child.
 Glam (voiced by Michael Donovan) - A pirate who targeted the Nova celebrity cruise ship.
 Count Hebron (voiced by Rob Paulsen) - A hunter.

Other characters
 Captain Friedrich (voiced by Rob Paulsen) - The police captain of the Electro City Police Department who distrusts Ace Cooper.
 Mona Malone (voiced by Kath Soucie) - The daughter of "Black Jack" Malone and Ace Cooper's childhood beloved. She often works with Ace to keep her father's plans from going too far.
 Duc Paparazzo (voiced by Billy West) - A reporter who covers the various activities in Electro City.
 DJ Mikkus (voiced by Michael Donovan) - A musical composer that is friends with Ace Cooper.
 Skip Ramsdale - A Flipball player for the Electro City Strikers who is a friend of Ace Cooper.
 Senator Dobbs (voiced by Michael Donovan) - The senator of Electro City who screens "Black Jack" Malone from prosecution as "Black Jack" Malone is close friends with him.

Episodes

Crew
 Jim Gomez - Voice Director

References

External links
The Magician at the official website of Xilam

1990s French animated television series
1997 French television series debuts
1999 French television series endings
French children's animated action television series
French children's animated adventure television series
French children's animated superhero television series
Xilam
French-language television shows
Fox Kids
Fox Broadcasting Company original programming
Television series by 20th Century Fox Television
France Télévisions children's television series